Pulavarnatham is a village in the Papanasam taluk of Thanjavur district, Tamil Nadu, India.

Demographics 

As per the 2001 census, Pulavarnatham had a total population of 1877 with 917 males and 960 females. The sex ratio was 1047. The literacy rate was 68.15.

References 

 

Villages in Thanjavur district